The Raymond Mhlaba Local Municipality council was established in 2016 by the merging of the Nkonkobe and Nxuba local municipalities and consists of forty-five members elected by mixed-member proportional representation. Twenty-three councillors are elected by first-past-the-post voting in twenty-three wards, while the remaining twenty-two are chosen from party lists so that the total number of party representatives is proportional to the number of votes received. In the election of 1 November 2021 the African National Congress (ANC) won a majority of thirty-three seats.

Results 
The following table shows the composition of the council after past elections.

August 2016 election

The following table shows the results of the 2016 election.

November 2021 election

The following table shows the results of the 2021 election.

References

Raymond Mhlaba
Elections in the Eastern Cape
Raymond Mhlaba Local Municipality